Catherine is a census-designated place (CDP) in and governed by Garfield County, Colorado, United States. The CDP is a part of the Glenwood Springs, CO Micropolitan Statistical Area. The population of the Catherine CDP was 228 at the United States Census 2010. The Glenwood Springs post office (Zip Code 81602) serves the area.

Geography
The CDP is located in the southeast corner of Garfield County, in the valley of the Roaring Fork River. Colorado State Highway 82 forms the northern edge of the CDP; it leads northwest  to Glenwood Springs, the Garfield County seat, and southeast  to Aspen. Catherine is bordered to the west by Mulford and to the east by El Jebel in Eagle County.

Demographics

See also

 List of census-designated places in Colorado

References

External links

 Garfield County website

Census-designated places in Garfield County, Colorado
Census-designated places in Colorado